On Friday 13 December 2013, multiple attacks killed at least 36 people and wounded 46 in Iraq.

A gunman killed at least 18 people, including 15 Iranians and another 7 were wounded, including 5 Iranians in Diyala Governorate, Iraq.

In Ramadi, a car bomb killed at least 6 people and another 10 were wounded.

At least 5 people die and another 14 were injured after a car exploded in Nahrawan.

A car bomb killed at least 5 people and 13 others were wounded in Madain.

Insurgents shoot dead at least 2 people in Ghazaliyah, Baghdad Governorate.

References

2013 murders in Iraq
21st-century mass murder in Iraq
Terrorist incidents in Iraq in 2013
Mass murder in 2013
Mass murder in Iraq
Car and truck bombings in Iraq
Spree shootings in Iraq
2013 in Iraq
December 2013 events in Iraq